Glottolog is a bibliographic database of the world's lesser-known languages, developed and maintained first at the Max Planck Institute for Evolutionary Anthropology in Leipzig, Germany (between 2015 and 2020 at the Max Planck Institute for the Science of Human History in Jena, Germany). Its main curators include Harald Hammarström and Martin Haspelmath.

Overview 
Sebastian Nordhoff and Harald Hammarström created the Glottolog/Langdoc project in 2011. The creation of Glottolog was partly motivated by the lack of a comprehensive language bibliography, especially in Ethnologue.

Glottolog provides a catalogue of the world's languages and language families and a bibliography on the world's less-spoken languages. It differs from the similar catalogue Ethnologue in several respects:

 It tries to accept only those languages that the editors have been able to confirm both exist and are distinct. Varieties that have not been confirmed, but are inherited from another source, are tagged as "spurious" or "unattested".
 It attempts only to classify languages into families which have been demonstrated to be valid.
 Bibliographic information is provided, especially for lesser-known languages.
 To a limited extent, alternative names are listed according to the sources which use them.

The language names used in the bibliographic entries are identified by ISO 639-3 code or Glottolog's own code (Glottocode); apart from a single point-location on a map at its geographic centre, no ethnographic or demographic information is provided. External links are provided to ISO, Ethnologue and other online language databases

The latest version is 4.7, released under the Creative Commons Attribution 4.0 International License in December 2022.

It is part of the Cross-Linguistic Linked Data project hosted by the Max Planck Institute for the Science of Human History.

Language families 
Glottolog is more conservative in its classification than most online databases in establishing membership of languages and groups within families but more liberal in considering unclassified languages to be isolates. Edition 4.7 lists 421 oral-language families and isolates as follows:

Creoles are classified with the language that supplied their basic lexicon.

In addition to the families and isolates listed above, Glottolog uses several non-genealogical families for various languages:
Pidgins (84 languages)
Mixed languages (9)
Artificial languages (32)
Speech registers (15)
Sign languages (215, including 1 pidgin, 4 auxiliary sign systems, and 2 unclassified sign languages)
Unclassifiable attested languages (121)
Unattested languages (68)
Bookkeeping: spurious languages, such as retired ISO entries; kept for bookkeeping purposes (392 including 6 sign languages)

Notes

References

External links

2011 establishments in Germany
Internet properties established in 2011
Max Planck Institute for the Science of Human History
Linguistics websites

Bibliographic databases and indexes
Linguistics databases
Cross-Linguistic Linked Data